Firefox is a web browser.

Firefox or fire fox may also refer to:
 Firefox (novel), a 1977 novel by Craig Thomas
 Firefox (film), a 1982 American film based on the novel
 Firefox (video game), an arcade game based on the film
 Mikoyan MiG-31, a fictional aircraft from the novel
 Firefox (mythology), a creature in Finnish folklore
 Firefox OS, an operating system for tablets and phones
 Eurofly Fire Fox, an Italian aircraft design
 Red panda or fire fox, a Himalayan tree mammal
 F15 Firefox, a scooter by Malaguti
 Firefox bikes, a bicycle brand of Hero Cycles
 Fire Fox, a move used by Fox McCloud in Super Smash Bros.

See also
 Firebox (disambiguation)
 Firefox Down, a sequel novel by Craig Thomas
 Foxfire (disambiguation)